Pobeda (Serbian: Pobeda /Победа, Hungarian: Pobedabirtok, Croatian: Pobeda) is a village located in the Bačka Topola municipality, in the North Bačka District of Serbia. It is situated in the Autonomous Province of Vojvodina. The village is ethnically mixed and its population numbering 342 people (2002 census).

Name

The name of the village means victory in the Serbian language.

Ethnic groups (2002 census)

 Hungarians = 161 (47.08%)
 Serbs = 104 (30.41%)
 Croats = 23 (6.73%)
 others.

Historical population

1981: 420
1991: 382

See also
 Bačka Topola municipality
List of places in Serbia
List of cities, towns and villages in Vojvodina

References
Slobodan Ćurčić, Broj stanovnika Vojvodine, Novi Sad, 1996.

Places in Bačka